Halik ng Vampira is a 1997 Philippine horror film directed by Peque Gallaga, who wrote the story, and Lore Reyes. The film stars Anjanette Abayari as the titular vampire.

Plot
Vanessa (Anjanette) is a cursed female vampire who poses as Midnight Solitaire, a sought-after caller on Dead Hour Dave's (Michael) radio show, to get many victims. Living a double life, Vanessa finds love in Victor (Raymond), whom she asks for help to cure her state.

Cast
 Anjanette Abayari as Vanessa
 Raymond Bagatsing as Victor
 Beth Tamayo as Suzanne
 Michael V. as Dead Hour Dave
 Patrick Guzman as Sting
 Marc Solis as Michael
 Jason Salcedo as Jackson
 Jaime Fabregas as Dr. Hellgaarde
 Romy Romulo as Sgt. Bueno
 Nathan Forrest as Dexter
 Engie Allarey as Beth's Friend
 Ian Veneracion as Truck Driver

References

External links

1997 films
1997 horror films
Films directed by Peque Gallaga
Filipino-language films
Philippine horror films
GMA Pictures films
OctoArts Films films
Films directed by Lore Reyes